is a romantic comedy and science fiction Japanese light novel series written by Kōshi Tachibana and illustrated by Tsunako. Twenty-two volumes have been published at Fujimi Shobo.



Light novels

Main series

Encore

Manga
A manga adaption of Date A Live with illustrations by Ringo began on April 16, 2012. Due to Ringo having health problems, the manga was cancelled after 6 chapters. The adaptation ended covering only a part of Shido's first date with Tohka.

A spin-off manga titled Date AST Like ran from March 2012 to December 2013 in Monthly Dragon Age. A total of four tankōbon volumes were released.

A third manga titled Date A Origami began serialisation in the January 2012 issue of Monthly Dragon Age, and ended in September 2013. The manga resumed serialisation following the airing of the second TV series before ultimately ended in July 2014. The content from the second serialisation was not collected into a tankōbon volume.

A new manga adaptation began serialisation in the January 2014 issue of Monthly Shōnen Ace, with illustrations done by Sekihiko Inui.

A fifth manga titled Date A Party began serialisation in the February 2014 issue of Monthly Dragon Age and was collected into one tankōbon volume.

References

External links
  
 Date A Live at Fujimi Shobo 
 
 

volumes
Lists of light novels
Lists of manga volumes and chapters